Basketball Club Neptūnas, commonly known as Neptūnas or Neptūnas Klaipėda, is a Lithuanian professional basketball team based in Klaipėda, Lithuania. The club participates in the Lithuanian Basketball League and internationally in the Champions League. It was founded in 1962 under the name BC Maistas (English: Food) and in 1964, BC Maistas's name was changed to BC Neptūnas. The club carries the name of the Roman sea god Neptune. Neptūnas participated in the 2014–15 EuroLeague season and is only the third Lithuanian club to participate in the premier European basketball league, after Žalgiris and Rytas.

History

First steps (1962–1993)
In 1966 Neptūnas won the Žalgiris friendship championship and next year with the same roster became runners-up.

Since 1970 there have been many changes in the team: coaches and players left the team and were replaced with new team members, so the team did not achieve better results. In 1975 Klaipėda's community decided to change the team from its foundations based on people from Klaipėda and the Samogitia region, who also finished studies in the cities of Vilnius and Kaunas. There were young and prospective players, whose energy helped to reach better results in a period of two years, including 3rd place in Lithuanian Spartakiada; in 1981 and 1982 they became runners-up of newspaper Sports championship, and also in 1983 they became champions of the Soviet Union Professional Union championship.

Difficult start in the LKL (1993–1998)
The Lithuanian Basketball Association was founded in 1993, when eight of the strongest Lithuanian basketball clubs' officials met with the representatives of the Šarūnas Marčiulionis basketball fund. Neptūnas was among that eight. This association would soon announce their basketball league that would start in the upcoming fall.

During the founding 1993–1994 LKL season, Neptūnas finished last, reaching only 4 victories per 36 games, despite the tireless efforts shown by Gintautas Bendžius, who averaged almost 20 points per game and was the third best scorer in the whole league. In the following season Neptūnas slightly improved, reaching 10 victories and suffering 30 defeats, with the help of a 21-year-old native Eurelijus Žukauskas, who quickly started becoming the star of the team and later was even nicknamed the "Lithuanian king of blocks".

In the 1995–1996 LKL season, Neptūnas progressed even further. With Svajūnas Airošius, Aloyzas Vasiliūnas, and Artūras Jakubauskas averaging double-digits in points and Eurelijus Žukauskas often adding solid double-doubles, the team qualified into the LKL playoffs for the first time with 17 victories as the 7th seed. But they were eliminated by the Lithuanian powerhouse Žalgiris Kaunas 0–2, after failing to guard the Lithuanian star and Olympic champion Rimas Kurtinaitis, who averaged 25.5 points over these games.

Neptūnas continued to show progress in the 1996–1997 season, qualifying for the LKL playoffs again by accomplishing a solid 19–17 record, the first with over 50% victories ratio in the club's LKL history. Despite losing the first series game versus BC Šiauliai 80–69, on April 4, 1997, Neptūnas achieved their first-ever victory in the LKL playoffs in a dominating fashion 88–60. Yet after Šiauliai's 88–73 revenge two days later, the series was lost 1–2. It was the last game for Eurelijus Žukauskas in a Neptūnas jersey, who, after averaging 15.7 points, 9.8 rebounds and 3.1 blocks, joined Žalgiris and soon became a EuroLeague champion and a multiple medalist with the Lithuania men's national basketball team. Another Neptūnas leader Artūras Jakubauskas left the team as well.

Following the loss of two long-term leaders, the team failed to compete with the same form during the 1997–1998 LKL season. Neptūnas finished as the 8th seed during the regular season with a 6–12 record, but after an unsuccessful second round they finished just 9th among 10 teams. The only consolation of the season was notable progress demonstrated by an 18-year-old Arvydas Macijauskas, who would later become one of the primary faces of Lithuanian basketball.

Participation in the Korać Cup (1998–2000)
The 1998–1999 season was remarkably different as on October 6, 1998, Neptūnas debuted in the FIBA Korać Cup, their first European tournament during a game versus the Espoon Honka, which they lost 93–73. But afterwards the team, led by Svajūnas Airošius, Arūnas Seferis and Arvydas Macijauskas, finished with a 4–2 record, claimed the second place in the group and advanced into the sixteenth-finals. They were stopped at that stage by Darüşşafaka, losing the series 0–2. Neptūnas also returned to the LKL playoffs that season after finishing 5th during the regular season. They were eliminated by BC Šiauliai yet again, this time 1–2. After the season, Arvydas Macijauskas signed with the Lietuvos rytas Vilnius.

During the 1999–2000 FIBA Korać Cup season, Neptūnas had less fortune than in the previous year. They were drawn into the group H, finished with just a 1–5 record, and after taking the 3rd spot in the group did not advance further. In the LKL, Neptūnas finished 8th and failed to challenge Žalgiris Kaunas in the first round of LKL playoffs, losing the series 0–2 with an average of 30 points difference.

First sparks in the LKL playoffs (2000–2012)

After the 1999–2000 season, Neptūnas became a constant LKL playoffs participant, though at first they were unable to overcome the quarter-finals barrier. During the 2000–2001 LKL season, Neptūnas, led by one of the LKL's best scorer and playmaker Vidas Ginevičius (19.59 points, 4.32 assists per game), finished in a desired 3rd seed during the regular season, but was shockingly eliminated 0–2 by the Alita Alytus in the quarter-final. During the following 2001–2002 LKL season, Neptūnas triumphed just 10 times per 32 games, but that was enough to qualify for the LKL playoffs as the 8th seed, although they were quickly wiped out 0–2 by an uprising Lithuanian powerhouse Lietuvos rytas Vilnius, led by young and hungry Ramūnas Šiškauskas, Robertas Javtokas, Simas Jasaitis, Rimantas Kaukėnas and a former Neptūnas player Arvydas Macijauskas. The 2002–2003 LKL season was only slightly different; this time the Neptūnas squad finished 6th in the regular season, but yet again was smashed 0–2 in the quarter-final by BC Šiauliai, in spite of all of Tomas Delininkaitis's efforts. In the 2003–2004 season, Neptūnas reached the all-time bottom by winning just 6 times per 36 games and finishing last in the league (10th), including an absolutely disastrous 22 game losing streak.

The 2004–2005 season was a bit more positive page in the club's history. During it, Neptūnas finished 4th during the regular LKL season and advanced to the TOP 5 teams of the league group, however Neptūnas was once again eliminated by BC Šiauliai in the knockout stage 1–2 and finished 5th in the final rankings. During the 2005 LKL All-Star Day, Petras Šalvis won the club's third LKL Three-point Shootout title. The team also participated in the Baltic Basketball League Elite Division for the first time as well, finishing 5th. Neptūnas slightly regressed again in the following 2005–2006 season, finishing 6th during the regular LKL season and, as previously, lost the first round of the LKL playoffs to BC Šiauliai 0–2 and finished only 10th in the BBL, with the only consolations being the club's fourth LKL Three-point Shootout title captured by Marius Kasiulevičius and the club's first-ever LKL Slam Dunk Contest champion title by Antonio Grant.

In the 2006–2007 season, Neptūnas finished 3rd during the regular LKL season for the second time in the club's history. Furthermore, they also finally sailed through the quarter-final stage of the LKL playoffs by overcoming the Nevėžis Kėdainiai 2–0. But Neptūnas' journey was again stopped by Lietuvos rytas at semi-finals 0–2, and Neptūnas qualified for their first historical LKL bronze final. The aspiration for the first-ever LKL medal was crushed by gallingly losing the series 0–3 to BC Šiauliai, with two home games being lost by just three and two points. In BBL, the team finished 2 places lower than in the previous season (12th).

Before the 2007–2008 season, Neptūnas signed with 19-year-old Deividas Gailius, who would soon lead Neptūnas during some of the club's most historic moments. However that season the team did not have much luck on the court. They ended up 5th during the regular LKL season and were once more eliminated in the quarter-final, this time by BC Alytus 1–2. The first series game, which could have made the series completely opposite, was dramatically lost by just three points in Alytus. Moreover, Neptūnas disappointingly finished only 16th in the BBL Elite Division. This was the club's worst and the last appearance in the elite division of the league.

The first part of the 2008–2009 LKL season finished almost identically when the club finished as the 5th seed, however the playoffs were drastically different. Neptūnas overcame the LKL quarter-final for the second time in history, beating Nevėžis 2–1. And after losing the semi-final to Žalgiris 0–2, Neptūnas returned to the bronze final for another try where they yet again faced a long-term rival BC Šiauliai. Despite the militant efforts and the thirst for a long-awaited revenge, the series was lost 2–3 following another dramatic defeat of 73–80 in Šiauliai, with Valdas Vasylius and Arvydas Eitutavičius scoring more than half of the team's points (45).

In the 2009–2010 LKL season, Neptūnas, led by a future team's manager Osvaldas Kurauskas, clinched the 5th spot during the regular season for a third straight year and was eliminated by the Juventus Utena 0–2 in the quarter-final. The 2010–2011 LKL regular season achieved just one less victory than the previous season, however this resulted in finishing only 8th and facing off the upcoming champions Žalgiris Kaunas in the first round of the playoffs. Regardless of being smashed 61–96 in Kaunas during the first series encounter, the team, led by a captain Martynas Mažeika, mightily fought in their home arena, this time losing only 82–88. Nevertheless, with the Švyturys Arena being built in the city, the historical victories and achievements were yet to come.

Historical victories and achievements (2012–2016)

2012–13 season: VTB United League debut

2012 was a memorable year for Neptūnas as they were invited to VTB United League, despite the fact that they only took 6th place in LKL the previous season. Club director Osvaldas Kurauskas said that they are not going to be group outsiders and that they will raise the club's budget for the next season. Neptūnas debuted in VTB United League on October 7, 2012 against CSKA Moscow. Despite a powerful opponent Neptūnas won two quarters by one point (23–22, 14–13), however it was not enough to win the game as Neptūnas lost 72–83. After the season in the VTB United League, they were last in the group, however they were invited to continue playing in this league for another season. Despite poor results in the VTB League, where they finished with a dismal 3–15 record, Neptūnas recovered in the LKL, thanks to very solid play from leader Deividas Gailius, finishing 3rd and winning the bronze medals for the first time in club history, in a competitive series against BC Prienai, winning 3–2.

2013–14 season: First time LKL finalists

The 2013–14 season was not less memorable for Neptūnas. During the regular season, Neptūnas defeated LKL champion and constant EuroLeague participant Žalgiris Kaunas several times, with the results 81–73 at Švyturys Arena and 79–88 at Žalgiris Arena. In the regular LKL season Neptūnas took third place and met Šiauliai in the quarter-finals, who they eliminated with a series result of 2–1. Neptūnas also won the semi-finals against Prienai TonyBet with a result of 2-0 and qualified to the LKL finals for the first time in club history. In the finals Neptūnas met previously defeated Žalgiris. Despite two former victories during the regular season, basketball experts were widely skeptical that Neptūnas could win any games there. Nevertheless, the militant Neptūnas showed that they can fight against Žalgiris and won their first LKL final series game with a 71–59 score in crammed Švyturys Arena, however then Neptūnas lost three games to Žalgiris and almost lost all the chances of winning the series.Game: Neptūnas 75 - 82 Zalgiris (2014-05-28)  In spite of that, Neptūnas did not give up and won the fifth series game with a score of 87–86, however they failed to do that again in the sixth series game and after being crushed 90–70, lost the LKL final series with a result of 4–2. Despite a sufficiently successful LKL season, Neptūnas had tough times in international competitions. In the second-tier European league EuroCup Neptūnas won four games out of ten and after taking fifth place of sixth in the group did not qualify into the second stage. Neptūnas also participated in VTB United League, however there, after winning five of eighteen games, Neptūnas did not qualify into the playoffs and took eighth place out of ten in the group. Following the best LKL season in club history, on June 25, 2014 Neptūnas was invited to join the prestigious EuroLeague as an LKL vice-champion for the 2014–15 season.

2014–15 season: EuroLeague debut

Before their debut in the EuroLeague, Neptūnas recalled former team leader Deividas Gailius. Multiple LKL champion Donatas Zavackas and UBL champion Michailas Anisimovas were signed as well. However, Anisimovas left the team shortly afterward without debuting in the EuroLeague due to the military crisis in Ukraine. On October 15, 2014, Neptūnas played their first EuroLeague game against the Laboral Kutxa, which they lost 69–88 despite playing more than two quarters point-to-point. On October 23, 2014, Neptūnas achieved the club's first EuroLeague victory against KK Crvena zvezda with a score of 83–81 after the Valdas Vasylius winning shot 3 seconds away from over-time. This was the first EuroLeague game played in the Neptūnas home-court. On October 31, 2014, Neptūnas lost their third EuroLeague game only after OT 81–85 against one of the strongest tournament teams, Olympiacos Piraeus, two times EuroLeague champion over the past three years. Despite being competitive and cherishing a chance of qualifying for the TOP16 stage, Neptūnas failed to accomplish this in their debut EuroLeague season, winning 4 games of 10 total and taking 5th place in the group. It was just one step from the TOP16's qualifier Galatasaray, who also finished with a 4–10 record. As a result, Neptūnas was transferred to the EuroCup Last 32 stage. The EuroCup was just a terrible place for Neptūnas. There they won only once against Paris-Levallois Basket, suffered five defeats and took last place in the group. A promising season in international competitions was finished painfully.

On February 20–22, Neptūnas participated in the 2015 LKF Cup. They surprisingly lost the quarter-finals game to Šiauliai 71–73 and ended the appearance in competition early.

Neptūnas recovered in the LKL, playing very solidly, even splitting the season series with Žalgiris. They defeated the Lithuanian powerhouse twice in two weeks: 67–65 in Klaipeda and 90–86 in Kaunas. Deividas Gailius led Neptūnas during these two games. But they took only the third spot during the regular season due to the unfavorable results versus Lietuvos rytas. Neptūnas defeated Dzūkija with the series result of 3–1, losing only once in Alytus 56–65. The semi-finals began unsuccessfully for the team versus Lietuvos rytas. Despite holding up close to the opponents the whole game, Neptūnas lost during the final minutes 88–79 in Vilnius. But Neptūnas, led by Deividas Gailius (22 points) and Arnas Butkevičius (20 points), successfully got revenge in Klaipėda, overcoming Rytas 107–101 after OT. The semi-final series was tied at 1–1. But Neptūnas lost another thriller 96–89 two days later in Vilnius and ended up on the edge of the precipice. Furthermore, primary Neptūnas center Simas Galdikas suffered a painful leg injury, after stepping on Kšyštof Lavrinovič's feet. Despite that, the team's coach Kazys Maksvytis said that "we will meet in Vilnius again". This promise did not came true following the 87–92 loss at home. Neptūnas lost the semi-final series 3–1 to Lietuvos rytas. And then Neptūnas suffered the biggest fiasco of the season. They shockingly lost to Juventus in the LKL bronze medals series 2–3, including an embarrassing defeat in the decisive game 69–84 in the home arena.

Neptūnas had the highest attendance rate in all of LKL during this season (3,022 spectators per game).

2015–16 season: Second EuroCup season

Following the lost LKL semi-final and the bronze final last season, Neptūnas did not automatically qualify into the EuroCup. But on June 29, 2015, they received the wild card to the tournament. For the first time in history, three Lithuanian basketball clubs were invited to participate in the second-tier European league. Krasta Auto (authorized BMW dealer in Lithuania) became one of the club sponsors, giving brand-new cars for the club members.

Neptūnas began the summer by losing former leader Deividas Gailius, who signed with Lietuvos rytas Vilnius. Gailius was replaced with one of the last season Juventus leaders Arvydas Šikšnius. Furthermore, former Juventus head coach Dainius Adomaitis signed a two-year deal with Neptūnas as well. Past Lithuania men's national basketball team head coach Kęstutis Kemzūra, Olympic champion Valdemaras Chomičius, Lithuania national team head coach assistant Darius Maskoliūnas and Gediminas Petrauskas were other solid candidates to replace Kazys Maksvytis. Neptūnas captain Martynas Mažeika signed a new two-year contract with the club. It was his 11th season at Neptūnas. Vytautas Šarakauskas and Simas Galdikas stayed with Neptūnas as well, both signing two-year contracts with the club. One of BK Ventspils's leaders Jerai Grant became the club's first foreigner in the summer of 2015. University of Rhode Island graduate Gilvydas Biruta, who represented the Denver Nuggets during the 2015 NBA Summer League, also joined BC Neptūnas. Three times Polish league champion and experienced EuroLeague player Daniel Ewing became Neptūnas' main point guard on August 15, 2015. Neptūnas also signed multiple NCAA three-pointers record holder Travis Bader to strengthen the shooting guard position.

On October 14, 2015 the new 2015–16 EuroCup season began with a loss to the powerful Galatasaray S.K. squad 90–94 in Klaipėda. The second game versus the Hapoel Jerusalem was not successful either, losing it 74–59. But afterwards the team began showing a very solid form. They won 6 of 7 games, including the noteworthy away games victories versus the BC Nizhny Novgorod 78–82 and Galatasaray S.K. 76–82, both of them being EuroLeague Top 16 participants last season. During the last match of the regular season versus the AEK, Neptūnas was even able to guarantee the first place in the group, but after dissipating a 16-point advantage in the third quarter, lost it 75–71 and finished second. Just before the start of the EuroCup's Last 32 stage, Trent Plaisted replaced Simas Galdikas. Despite a very successful first stage, the Last 32 phase began with a desperate loss to Aris 84–58 in Thessaloniki. However, the team then created a feast in Klaipėda, defeating Alba Berlin 73–65. Following it, Neptūnas suffered two close defeats to the Italian powerhouse EA7 Emporio Armani Milan (79–71 in Milan and 73–74 in Klaipėda). The pleasant 72–68 rematch with Aris left the Neptūnas hopes for the playoffs alive, though it vanished after losing to Alba 62–76 in Berlin and finishing with a 2–4 record in the second round.

On 19–21 February, Neptūnas competed in the newly formed Karaliaus Mindaugo taurė tournament. The team easily overcame BC Šiauliai 96–58 at the quarter-final, but was powerfully stopped at the semi-final by the upcoming champions Lietuvos rytas Vilnius 97–79. Still, they rehabilitated by winning the club's first Lithuanian Cup bronze medals after crushing Vytautas Prienai-Birštonas 88–51. Shortly after the competition, Gilvydas Biruta was replaced with Angus Brandt.

In LKL, Neptūnas finished the regular season with a third seed and a 19–17 record. Švyturys Arena had the most spectators in the LKL for a second straight season, this time with 3,474 per game.  In the quarter-final, Neptūnas eliminated BC Šiauliai 3–1. The semi-final series versus Lietuvos rytas Vilnius was one of the most dramatic in the league's history. Neptūnas began it by shocking Rytas in their home arena with an 83–71 victory. Afterwards, the team also secured their home court in Game 2, winning 70–68. The fate of the historic series was to be determined in Game 5, following two dramatic Rytas victories: 66–64 and 74–73. During Game 5, Daniel Ewing led Neptūnas to another stunning upset of the Lithuanian powerhouse 73–72, surprisingly won the intense series 3–2, and advanced into the LKL final just for a second time in club history. The final series was begun with an 83–72 loss to Žalgiris Kaunas. Just three days later, Neptūnas by surprise swept Žalgiris 76–54 to tie the series 1–1. In spite of that, later Neptūnas failed to compete in the series, losing the next three games by an average of 25 points and the series 1–4.

Basketball Champions League participants (2016–2020)

2016–17 season: Basketball Champions League debut
On October 21, 2016, Neptūnas decided to choose the FIBA Basketball Champions League instead of the EuroCup. On July 10, Neptūnas re-signed with the efficient center Jerai Grant for another season. On July 27, Larry Drew II, son of the prominent NBA player and coach Larry Drew, joined the team to replace Daniel Ewing who left the team. On August 4, former Lithuania men's national basketball team member Tadas Klimavičius signed a two-seasons deal with the club. On August 10, Matas Jucikas signed a long-term (three-seasons) deal. On August 24, another Lithuanian, Mindaugas Kačinas, fresh out of the NCAA Division I US college basketball system at South Carolina, was signed. On August 26, Jimmy Baron became the last addition to the team's roster before the beginning of the season. On November 3, the front line was strengthened with Omari Johnson.

On October 19, Neptūnas started the 2016–17 Basketball Champions League season with a close 67–65 away victory over Uşak Sportif. Neptūnas ended up as the second team in the group, with a 10–4 record and a first round playoff bye.

In January, Tadas Klimavičius left after terminating his contract and signed with BC Vytautas. While the Klimavičius departure was not as significant, team star and leader Jimmy Baron signed with BC Lietuvos rytas in February, shocking both the team and its fans. On February 10, just one day after Baron's departure, the team released Drew and Johnson, after reported discipline violations. Club director and longtime former player Osvaldas Kurauskas was fired as well. The departures affected the team, who were easily defeated in the first round of the King Mindaugas Cup by BC Žalgiris 58:81. However, by the end of February, good news struck the team - Daniel Ewing returned to Neptūnas from Israel, replacing Larry Drew at the point guard position, and Neptūnas also signed Chris Lofton to a deal, to replace Jimmy Baron. The changes did not help the team in the Champions League, ending with a loss on aggregate to MHP Riesen Ludwigsburg in the quarterfinals 119:125 (61:73 away and 58:52 home).

While the season was over in the Champions League, Neptūnas went on a win streak in the LKL, climbing up the standings. They finished the regular season in fourth seed with 21 victories and 15 defeats balance. During the 2016–17 LKL Playoffs quarter-final Neptūnas eliminated Juventus Utena 3–0, and advanced into the semi-finals where they faced Lithuanian champions Žalgiris Kaunas. Game 1 of the series did not provide much intrigue in Kaunas, with Žalgiris desperately crushing Neptūnas 83–54. The view was completely different during Game 2 in Klaipėda where Neptūnas defeated Žalgiris 73–70 to even the series 1–1. In Kaunas, Žalgiris won again, 83:60 and finished the series in Klaipėda, where Neptūnas lost the game 53:69 and the series 1–3. During the LKL bronze final Neptūnas faced Lietuvos rytas Vilnius for the intense series. Both teams successfully defended their home courts with Neptūnas losing the opening game on May 29, 2017 in Vilnius 79–60, but winning 83–70 on June 1 in Klaipėda. Later the series continued in the same order with Lietuvos rytas defeating Neptūnas 71–54 for the second time in Vilnius on June 4, and Neptūnas doing the same 70–65 in Klaipėda on June 7 to force the Game 5 of the series. Neptūnas lost the series on June 10 in Vilnius after losing the crucial game 75–66 and the series 3–2, mostly because of two former Neptūnas players Jimmy Baron and Deividas Gailius who combined for more than a half of Rytas' points (39). A very promising season at the beginning ended on a very disappointing note.

2017–18 season: Second Basketball Champions League season

On June 28, 2017, it was announced that Neptūnas will compete in the 2017–18 Basketball Champions League season without participating in the qualifying tournament. On the same day former head coach Kazys Maksvytis returned to the team, replacing the newly chosen Lithuania men's national basketball team head coach Dainius Adomaitis due to the difficulties to match two coaching positions. Edgaras Želionis became club's first player addition for the upcoming season on July 5, 2017. Afterwards, the team has signed two long-term Lithuania national team members Tomas Delininkaitis and Renaldas Seibutis. On July 27, 2017, Neptūnas reached an agreement with Laimonas Kisielius and signed a two-years deal. On August 10, 2017, the team signed Juan Palacios to replace Jerai Grant. On August 14, 2017, former team member Simas Galdikas returned to the team. Due to the departure of the previous long-term captain Martynas Mažeika, Simas Galdikas was chosen to replace him in the position.

On September 21, 2017, Neptūnas began the 2017–18 LKL season by defeating BC Šiauliai 73–82. On the next day, Malcolm Armstead, known for his scoring ability, was signed. After a solid 5–1 LKL season start, including a 73–64 victory versus the reigning champions Žalgiris Kaunas, on October 10, 2017, Neptūnas successfully started the 2017–18 Basketball Champions League season with a last seconds 75–73 victory over the French League champions Élan Chalon. On October 25, 2017, Malcolm Armstead was replaced with Jerry Johnson due to his poor sport form. On November 1, 2017, Neptūnas crushed Gaziantep Basketbol during the Champions League away game 114–73 and achieved their highest victory in the history of the tournament. More wins followed - a dominating away against Betaland Capo d'Orlando 90:60, and a home win against P.A.O.K. BC - 82:69. Neptūnas also picked up home wins over Lietuvos rytas Vilnius 81:76 and Lietkabelis Panevėžys 86:76, and moved up to 2nd place in the LKL standings. However, financial problems surfaced - Neptūnas was badly beaten in the Champions League by defending league champion Iberostar Tenerife 67:90, and lost team leaders Mindaugas Girdžiūnas and Arnas Butkevičius, who left the team to sign with Lietuvos rytas. On December 14, 2017, team manager Artūras Žalys was fired and was replaced by a prominent Lithuanian basketball agent Virginijus Bulotas. This proved to be false, as the man that wanted to hire Bulotas, Artūras Jakubauskas, was fired and was replaced by Giedrius Vasilkevičius. Sigitas Ambrazevičius became the new team owner. After some more bad news - Palacios leaving for Beşiktaş J.K., some good news arrived - Neptūnas signed Vytautas Šulskis and new point guard Brandon Fields, who replaced the departed Girdžiūnas. In the second round of the Champions League, Neptūnas struggled - they lost to Élan Chalon 81:86, but won the away game against Ventspils 84:69 (Neptūnas had won at home 87:80 in the first round). Neptūnas suffered their first loss of the season at home against MHP Riesen Ludwigsburg 71:87 (Neptūnas lost the first round away game 83:95). In an away game against Gaziantep, Neptūnas were down by double digits for most of the game - but managed to force overtime, and lost 94:98 after coach Maksvytis got ejected. After a dominating home win against Betaland Capo d'Orlando 99:62, Neptūnas lost the final two games of the regular season against P.A.O.K. 70:91 in Thessaloniki and against Iberostar at home, 67:83. Neptūnas finished the regular season with a 7–7 record, but made the playoffs. On February 13, Neptūnas suffered one of the most embarrassing losses of the season, losing to BC Dzūkija 77:85 in the quarterfinals of the King Mindaugas Cup. The loss was especially painful, because the final four of the tournament was held in Klaipėda. In the Champions League playoffs, Neptūnas suffered another heartbreak, losing the SIG Basket on aggregate 151:158, winning the first match at home 73:68, but losing a thriller at Strasbourg in overtime, 78:88. In the LKL, Neptūnas rebounded and defeated Lietuvos rytas 99:86 in Vilnius, thus showing signs of improved play. Neptūnas then signed center Jameel McKay, to help the team in the LKL. McKay, however, played poorly and was released in May.

Neptūnas finished 3rd in the regular season in the LKL, and defeated BC Pieno žvaigždės 3:1 in the quarterfinals, including a dominating 101:64 win in the deciding game four in Pasvalys. Neptūnas faced rival BC Lietuvos rytas in the semifinal. After winning the first game 84:79 in Vilnius and taking the series lead, Neptūnas had one of the worst shooting performances of all time, losing 49:67 in Klaipėda, with Rytas tying the series 1:1. Rytas then won the third game in Vilnius 74:67, and took a 2:1 lead in the series. Led by Želionis, Seibutis, Delininkaitis and Galdikas, Neptūnas tied the series with a 74:70 win in Klaipėda. In the decisive fifth game in Vilnius, Neptūnas lost a close game 82:88, and lost the series 2:3. In the series for 3rd place, Neptūnas faced previous year's finalist, BC Lietkabelis. Having home court advantage, Neptūnas started the series with an embarrassing 69:83 loss - Lietkabelis had led by 29 points at one point and only when young players like Matas Jucikas and Laurynas Beliauskas were in, did Neptūnas cut the deficit. Down 0:1 in the series, Neptūnas was down for much of the game in Panevėžys, including an 11-point deficit in the 2nd quarter, before coming from behind and winning the game 71:69, after a last second layup by Seibutis. The series was tied 1:1. In the third game at home, Neptūnas took the lead in the first quarter and never looked back, winning 79:71 and taking a 2:1 series lead. In the fourth game in Panevėžys, Neptūnas started slowly, but led by Želionis, who scored 27 points in the game, Delininkaitis and Johnson, took the lead by half-time, and went on to win the game 89:78, winning the series 3:1 and winning the bronze medals for the second time in club history. After all the turmoil all season long, the win helped the team finish the season on a high.

2018–19 season: Third Basketball Champions League season

After the season ended, Neptūnas entered the off-season with uncertainty. Team leaders Seibutis and Želionis departed, and players like Fields, Johnson, Šulskis and Kačinas were released. Coach Maksvytis remained with the team, and all the chaos with the management was sorted out. Neptūnas signed Paulius Dambrauskas and Lorenzo Williams from rival BC Lietkabelis, as the new point guards. Neptūnas then signed back Jerai Grant, who returned after a one-year absence, at center. Žalgiris loaned Neptūnas Gytis Masiulis, one of the team's top prospects, to get more playing time. Neptūnas also signed Osvaldas Olisevičius, the leader of BC Pieno žvaigždės, to a one-year deal. Kyle Weaver signed with Neptūnas in August. Neptūnas showed a lot of promise during the pre-season, winning a couple of tournaments. On January 14, 2019, Deividas Gailius returned to Neptūnas, signing for the rest of the season. On April 4, 2019, Weaver was released by Neptūnas.

Neptūnas started the 2018–19 LKL season with a 100:76 home win over BC Nevėžis. On October 14, Neptūnas shocked champions BC Žalgiris with a dominating 75:60 win in Kaunas, and climbed to first place in the LKL standings. On November 3, Neptūnas picked up another shocking away win, beating rivals BC Rytas in Vilnius, 78:66. The seven game win streak ended on November 18, in a home defeat against BC Rytas, 78:93, also losing the 1st place in the standings to Žalgiris. Neptūnas recovered from the loss by crushing rival BC Lietkabelis 100:76 in Panevėžys, tying Rytas for second place in the standings. On January 6, the first game of the new year, Neptūnas shocked Žalgiris again, this time winning a double overtime thriller at home, 98:93. This win helped Neptūnas retain the second place over Rytas in the standings. A shocking loss to BC Pieno žvaigždės at home, 77:80, lead to Neptūnas giving the spot up to Rytas. Neptūnas returned to the second place the next week, after Rytas suffered a loss themselves. On March 3, Neptūnas shocked Žalgiris again, with an 81:71 win at home, and becoming the first team in since 2014 to beat Žalgiris in a season series. The win helped Neptūnas retain second place in the standings over Rytas.  On March 30, however, after a very poor fourth quarter, Neptūnas lost to Rytas in Vilnius, 52:70, and lost the second place to Rytas. On April 11, Neptūnas picked up a dominating home win over Rytas, 89:74, continuing the battle for second place. An 8-game win streak followed, and even after an 80:90 loss to Žalgiris on May 9 snapped it, Neptūnas had already secured second place and homecourt advantage in the playoffs. Neptūnas finished with a 28–8 record. Neptūnas defeated SkyCop Prienai 2:1 in the quarterfinals. In the semifinals, Neptūnas faced rivals Rytas. Having homecourt advantage for the first time, Neptūnas started the series at home – however, Neptūnas played the worst game of the season, with Rytas taking a lead at halftime, and increasing it by the end, taking a 75:46 win in Klaipėda, with Neptūnas even hearing boos from the fans. In the second game, Neptūnas desperately needed the win, to take the series back to Klaipėda - in a tension filled match, where team captain Galdikas even received an ejection, Neptūnas started poorly, with Rytas taking a huge lead at halftime. By the end, Neptūnas was only able to cut down the deficit – 70:83 and a very disappointing 0:2 loss. In the 3rd place series, Neptūnas faced Lietkabelis, in a rematch from last season, which Neptūnas won, and the King Mindaugas Cup of 2019, where Neptūnas lost. Neptūnas won the series 3:0, with wins at home 89:77 and 84:77, and away 88:75.

At the star of the 2018–19 Basketball Champions League, Neptūnas lost to Virtus Bologna in an away game, 78:83. Neptūnas got their first win by defeating Beşiktaş Sompo Japan 78:63 at home the next week. After a hard-fought away loss to B.C. Oostende, 89:91, Neptūnas rebounded by scoring two wins - a home victory and revenge over SIG Strasbourg 92:83, and finally, an away win against KK Olimpija, 97:88, being led by Jerai Grant and a resurgent Delininkaitis. The win streak was stopped at home by Promitheas Patras B.C., with Neptūnas losing the match 82:83 after some turnovers in the end. In the final game of the first round, Neptūnas suffered one of the worst losses in European competitions, losing to Medi Bayreuth 78:102 in an away loss, finishing with a 3–4 record. Neptūnas recovered at the start of the second round, handing Virtus their first loss in the competition with an 88:85 home win. In Istanbul, Neptūnas lost to Beşiktaş 70:77. Another heartbreaking loss to Oostende, this time at home, 77:79, plummeted Neptūnas to a disastrous 7th place in the standings. However, Neptūnas recovered - sparked by the return of Gailius, Neptūnas finished the regular season with four consecutive wins - an away win over SIG Strasbourg 90:80, a home win over KK Olimpija 82:74, getting revenge over Promitheas Patras with a dominating 82:69 away victory, and defeating Medi Bayeruth 83:73 at home, finishing with an 8–6 record. After Oostende lost at home to SIG, Neptūnas qualified to the playoffs for the third consecutive season, and finished 3rd in standings. In the playoffs, Neptūnas faced Hapoel Jerusalem, one of the top teams in the competition. In the first game at home, Neptūnas lost 74:86. In the rematch, Neptūnas lost 64:84, losing the series on aggregate 138:170.

2019–20 season

The third-place finish helped Neptūnas directly qualify for the 2019-20 Basketball Champions League. Coach Maksvytis, team leader Grant, Williams, Dambrauskas, Bieliauskas, Kisielius and Mikalauskas left during the summer. Assistant coach Tomas Rinkevičius was named as Maksvytis replacement. Neptūnas signed Andre Williamson as the new center to replace Grant, while Darrin Dorsey was a replacement for Williams as the new point guard. Žygimantas Janavičius was also signed to strengthen the point guard position. Masiulis was loaned for one more season by Žalgiris, while another Euroleague team, Kirilobet Baskonia, loaned Tadas Sedekerskis for Neptūnas. Matas Jogėla signed just before the season started. Team veterans Gailius and Delininkaitis remained with the team. Neptūnas won the Vladas Garastas Cup, defeating BC Dnipro 75–63 in the finals, which also served as the club's 55 year anniversary tournament. Longtime captain Martynas Mažeika returned to the team in January.

Neptūnas started off the 2019–20 LKL season by defeating BC Juventus 80–67 at home. Neptūnas struggled in the LKL, and in February, with an 11–9 record and 5th place in the standings, and an early exit in the Champions League also, replaced coach Rinkevičius with assistant Jurica Žuža. Under Žuža, Neptūnas qualified for the King Mindaugas Cup, by beating BC Dzūkija 92:89 away and 73:72 at home, avenging the loss in 2018, and qualifying for the Final Four tournament, held on Neptūnas homecourt Švyturio Arena. Despite promising statements from the management and coach Žuža, the tournament ended with Neptūnas finishing in a disappointing 4th place, suffering a blowout loss in the semifinals to BC Rytas 71:96, and a loss in the 3rd place game to BC Lietkabelis, 73:84. Coach Žuža was then replaced by the coach of the reserve team Neptūnas-Akvaservis, Tomas Gaidamavičius. Due to the COVID-19 pandemic, the LKL season was ended prematurely, with Neptūnas finishing in 4th place.

In the Basketball Champions League, Neptūnas defeated Happy Casa Brindisi 81–71 in the home opener. In the second game, Neptūnas faced JDA Dijon, also at home - despite the best efforts from Neptūnas, JDA Dijon took a huge lead at halftime, and won the game 89–75. Tied at 1-1, Neptūnas won the first away game of the tournament, beating PAOK 94–72 in Thessaloniki. Neptūnas then defeated Casademont Zaragoza 91–73 at home. Neptūnas lost to Telekom Baskets Bonn, 85–97, in an away game. Neptūnas finished the first round with a home win over Beşiktaş J.K. 86–80, and an away loss to Falco KC, 73–97, tied for 3rd place with a 4–3 record. The second round, however, ended up with failure - Neptūnas suffered away losses to both Brindisi and JDA Dijon, 82:96 and 71:92, a very painful home loss to PAOK 80:86, and lost to Casademonet Zaragoza, 70:86, losing 5 consecutive games for the first time in the competition. While Neptūnas defeated Telekom Baskets 93:68 at home, an away loss to Beşiktaş, 69:76, ended any hope for Neptūnas to reach the playoffs, for the first time since joining the competition. Neptūnas finished the competition with a win at home over Falco KC, 87:83, finishing 6th with a 6–8 record.

The pandemic difficulties (2020–present)
2020–21 season
Neptūnas faced off with the financial difficulties when the rest of the 2019–20 season was cancelled due to the COVID-19 pandemic, therefore the club formed its next season roster mostly from young Lithuanian players and had no foreign players. Starting the 2020–21 season, Neptūnas participated in the 2020–21 Basketball Champions League season Qualification Group D, where it defeated the London Lions 77–73 in the semi-finals, however the team failed to qualify to the regular season after losing the qualification final to the BC Tsmoki-Minsk 69–59, and played only in the Lithuanian League. In the LKL, Neptūnas became the surprise team of the year. Under coach Tomas Gaidamavičius, the young team with some veteran leadership, led by guys like Martynas Mažeika, Žygimantas Janavičius and Martynas Jogėla, were in playoff contention all season long. Benas Griciūnas, Evaldas Šaulys, Džiugas Slavinskas, among others, also had good seasons. Deividas Gailius returned near the end of the season to Neptūnas, immediately becoming the team leader and leading Neptūnas to the 6th seed in the regular season. In the playoffs, Neptūnas also nearly upset the heavily favored Lietkabelis Panevėžys in the playoffs, and while getting swept in the playoffs, gave Neptūnas fans hope for the future. In the King Mindaugas Cup, Neptūnas also reached the semifinals.

2021–22 season
Before the 2021-2022 season, Neptūnas largely kept the same core as in the previous season, re-signed Deividas Gailius, and also signed the returning Edgaras Želionis, one of the best players for Neptūnas back in the 2017-2018 season. Neptūnas, having higher expectations for the season, expected to continue where they left off the previous season. However, the season began disastrously for Neptūnas. By December, Neptūnas was coming off a losing streak, which included many blow-out loses, and was out of playoff contention in the LKL. Needing changes, coach Gaidamavičius was released by Neptūnas, and in a surprising move, Dainius Adomaitis returned as the head coach of Neptūnas. Neptūnas regained their form - in the LKL, by April, Neptūnas had rose up to the 7th seed in the standings. Neptūnas finished the LKL regular season with a memorable 93-88 win over Rytas Vilnius in the regular season final. In the playoffs, Neptūnas faced Žalgiris Kaunas, now coached by former Neptūnas head coach Kazys Maksvytis. Neptūnas surprised all critics – they managed to stretch the series out to all five games, and only in the deciding fifth game did Žalgiris finish off Neptūnas and won the series 3-2. Gailius and Benas Griciūnas, along with the biggest surprise of the series, Nojus Mineikis, all shined during the series. After the season, Adomaitis once again left Neptūnas.

Players

Retired numbers
On May 22, 2014 Neptūnas retired their first two numbers:

Current roster

Depth chart

Squad changes for/during the 2022–23 season

In

|}

Out

|}

Loaned Out

|}

Logos

Honours
Domestic competitionsLithuanian SSR Championship Winners (1): 1962

Club achievements

Detailed information of former rosters and results.

 LKL playoffs 
 2001–2002 season 8th (lost quarter-finals against Lietuvos Rytas 0:2)
 2002–2003 season 6th (lost quarter-finals against Šiauliai 0:2)
 2004–2005 season 5th (lost quarter-finals against Šiauliai 1:2)
 2006–2007 season 4th (lost bronze final against Šiauliai 0:3)
 2008–2009 season 4th (lost bronze final against Šiauliai 2:3)
 2009–2010 season 5th (lost quarter-finals against Juventus 0:2)
 2010–2011 season 8th (lost quarter-finals against Žalgiris 0:2)
 2011–2012 season 6th (lost quarter-finals against Šiauliai 1:2)
 2012–2013 season 3rd (won bronze final against Prienai 3:2)
 2013–2014 season 2nd (lost grand final against Žalgiris 2:4)
 2014–2015 season 4th (lost bronze final against Juventus 2:3)
 2015–2016 season 2nd (lost grand final against Žalgiris 1:4)
 2016–2017 season 4th (lost bronze final against Lietuvos Rytas 2:3)
 2017–2018 season 3rd (won bronze final against Lietkabelis 3:1)
 2018–2019 season: 3rd (won bronze final against Lietkabelis 3:0)

Notable players

 A foreign international player who has significantly contributed into the results of the club.
 A Lithuanian player who has significantly contributed into the results of the club.

 Lithuanians: Tomas Vanagas 1993–2000
 Gintautas Bendžius 1993–1996, 1999–2000
 Artūras Jakubauskas 1994–1997
 Aloyzas Vasiliūnas 1994–1997
 Eurelijus Žukauskas 1994–1997
 Martynas Purlys 1995–1997
 Svajūnas Airošius 1995–2000
 Donatas Zavackas 1996–1998, 2003, 2006, 2014–2016
 Alvydas Pazdrazdis 1997–1999
 Arvydas Macijauskas 1997–1999
 Mindaugas Mockus 1997–2004, 2006–2008
 Dainius Miliūnas 1998–2000
 Rolandas Urkis 1998–2001
 Audrius Mineikis 1999–2005, 2005–2006
 Gintautas Vileita 1999–2000, 2005–2006
 Petras Šalvis 2000–2005
 Vidas Ginevičius 2000–2001
 Sigitas Kažukauskas 2000–2002
 Vaidotas Pridotkas 2000–2008
 Mantas Ruikis 2001–2005, 2010–2012
 Tomas Delininkaitis 2001–2002, 2017–2020
 Osvaldas Kurauskas 2005–2006, 2008–2010
 Vitalijus Stanevičius 2005–2008
 Vaidotas Pečiukas 2005–2006, 2007–2008
 Marius Runkauskas 2007–2008, 2011–2014
 Arvydas Eitutavičius 2008–2009, 2013–2014
 Valdas Vasylius 2008–2009, 2010–2011, 2013–2015

 Lithuanians (cont): Martynas Mažeika 2000–2004, 2008–2009, 2010–2017, 2020–present
 Giedrius Gustas 2012–2013
 Martynas Andriuškevičius 2012–2013
 Vytautas Šarakauskas 2012–2017
 Deividas Gailius 2007-2009, 2012–2013, 2014–2015, 2019–2020
 Renaldas Seibutis 2017–2018
 Džiugas Slavinskas 2018–2021
 Foreigners: Jeff Halloway 2000–2001
 Kipp Christianson 2002–2003
 Willie Mitchell 2003–2004
 Jānis Porziņģis 2003–2004
 Antonio Grant 2004–2005, 2010
 Sheiku Kabba 2004–2005
 Jerome Coleman 2005–2006
 Latece Williams 2005–2006
 Ron Dorsey 2006–2007
  Michailas Anisimovas 2007–2008, 2014
 Arinze Onuaku 2011
 Rashaun Broadus 2012–2013
 Mustafa Shakur 2014–2015
 Keith Benson 2014–2015
 Daniel Ewing 2015–2016, 2017
 Jerai Grant 2015–2017, 2018–2019
 Travis Bader 2015–2016
 Jimmy Baron 2016–2017
 Chris Lofton 2016–2017
 Juan Palacios 2017
 Darrin Dorsey 2019–2020,2021

Head coaches

  Robertas Usaris (1964–1968)
  Antanas Kašiuba (1968–1974)
  Saulius Vilkas (1974–1983)
  Eugenijus Milkontas (1983–1993)
  Stasys Kaupys (1993–1995)
  Grigorijus Pancerovas (1995–1996)
  Rimas Girskis (1996–1999)
  Grigorijus Pancerovas (1994–2004)
  Robertas Kuncaitis (2004–2005)
  Dean Murray (2005–2006)
  Robertas Kuncaitis (2006–2007)
  Aloyzas Rudys (2007–2008)
  Rytis Vaišvila (2008–2009)
  Paulius Juodis (2009–2010)
  Rytis Vaišvila (2010)
  Robertas Kuncaitis (2010–2011)
  Paulius Juodis (2011–2012)
  Osvaldas Kurauskas (2012)
  Kazys Maksvytis (2012–2015)
  Dainius Adomaitis (2015–2017)
  Kazys Maksvytis (2017–2019)
  Tomas Rinkevičius (2019–2020)
  Jurica Žuža (2020)
  Tomas Gaidamavičius (2020–2021)
  Dainius Adomaitis (2021–2022)
  Mindaugas Brazys (2022-)

Team managementBoard Representative Sigitas AmbrazevičiusBoard members Arunas Tuma
 Alvydas Vaiciunas
 Edvinas Vaickus
 Vytautas Lygnugarys
 Vidmantas DambrauskasDirector of the Club'

 Sigitas Ambrazevičius

Statistical leaders

All time points per game in all tournaments (PPG)

Youth academy

Neptūnas closely works with Vladas  Knašius Basketball School as a ladder for youth to professional basketball. Players such as Arvydas Macijauskas, Eurelijus Žukauskas, Tomas Delininkaitis, and many players of the current Neptūnas roster attended V. Knašius Basketball School.

Video game

Neptūnas basketball club was featured in the NBA 2K16 video game.

References

External links
 Official website of Neptūnas  
 BC Neptūnas LKL.lt 

 
Sport in Klaipėda
Basketball teams established in 1962
EuroLeague clubs
1962 establishments in Lithuania